Tifone has been borne by at least two ships of the Italian Navy and may refer to:

 , previously the mercantile Bata purchased by Italy in 1916 and renamed. She was discarded in 1920.
 , a  launched in 1942 and sunk in 1943.

Italian Navy ship names